Somarelang Tikologo (Environment Watch Botswana) is a member-based environmental NGO located in Gaborone, Botswana. The organization aims to promote sustainable environmental protection by educating, demonstrating, and encouraging best practices in environmental planning, resource conservation, and waste management in Botswana.

Somarelang Tikologo has a small staff and volunteer members that undertake numerous environmental awareness raising activities throughout the community each year.

History
Somarelang Tikologo was initiated in 1991 by three University of Botswana lecturers, due to a concern about the state of Gaborone's environment. These lecturers operated Somarelang Tikologo activities out of their offices for a year.

In 1994 Somarelang Tikologo was officially registered as a Society. The First Annual General Meeting was held in March 1995, at which the first Executive Committee was elected and membership fees decided upon.

Today, Somarelang Tikologo has more than 500 individual members, 50 corporate members and 22 Life members supporting its network in Botswana. An Environmental Resource Centre operates daily at the office, and publications include fact sheets, newsletters, workshop proceedings and educational materials.

Somarelang Tikologo's Work

Waste Management
The country of Botswana has yet to impose legislation governing the collection of recyclable materials.  As such, waste levels are quite high.  Somarelang Tikologo promotes the internationally acclaimed Waste Management Hierarchy of Reduce, Reuse, Recycle, with an aim to ultimately achieve safe and proper landfill disposal with a focus on recycling. This waste management approach aims at conserving and protecting the limited and fragile natural resources, maintaining a healthy and clean environment, and a conducive environment for sustainable development.

Somarelang Tikologo has an on-site Recycling Center where anyone in Gaborone can drop off recyclable materials. Once sorted, the plastics and glass are transported by truck to recycling facilities in South Africa and all paper products are transported by truck to recycling facilities in Zimbabwe.  The costs to transport all recyclable materials in this way is generously donated by Kgalagadi Beverages Trust.

Resource Conservation
The Somarelang Tikologo Resource Conservation Subcommittee conducts demonstration projects at local schools in Gaborone, as well as country-wide awareness-raising campaigns to educate Botswana about the importance of conservation of these resources. Popular topics of education include increasing the efficiency with which resources are utilized as well as to ensure equity in the distribution of the benefits accrued from harnessing said resources.

Environmental Planning
The Environmental Planning Sub-Committee aims to promote the integration of environmental issues into urban planning in Greater Gaborone and the rest of Botswana.  This includes issues relating to public open spaces, urban agriculture, public transport, recreational facilities, and public participation in the decision making process.

Somarelang Tikologo is currently developing an Ecological Park.

PR & Fundraising
The Fundraising and Public Relations Sub-Committee of Somarelang Tikologo provides a venue for the members of Somarelang Tikologo to voice their concerns regarding the state of Botswana's environment, and contribute to making positive change in Botswana's environmental situation through various activities. Such activities aim to promote a greater awareness of environmental issues to the general public and certain target groups, and have a positive impact on local communities and the environment.

The Sub-Committee specifically focuses on the following objectives in relation to the environmental planning of Greater Gaborone and the rest of Botswana:

To provide marketing support to and promote the efforts of each Sub-committee.
To assist in the development of fundraising plans
To implement selected fundraising activities
To develop and implement the communication strategies for ST (Newsletters, brochure, website, promotional products, etc.)
To develop and promote the Green Shop project
To provide advice on income-generation projects
To develop and implement a Membership Program
To develop and implement a Volunteer Program

Ecological Park

Somarelang Tikologo is located inside an ecological park at Plot 3491 Ext 4 in Gaborone, Botswana.
The park was officially opened by the Botswana Minister of Environment, Wildlife and Tourism, Hon. Onkokame kitso Mokaila on February 27, 2009.  The park itself consists of five main components: Playground for children, the Green Shop, Community Organic Garden, Recycling Center, and Eco Cafe.

Playground For Children
The playground is open to the community for families and children to visit anytime during business hours.  The purpose of the playground is to demonstrate fun and environmentally friendly ways that locals can make their own yards more entertaining, and also to help establish Somarelang Tikologo and thus Recycling as a welcomed part of the community.

Green Shop

The Green Shop is a small store in ST's Ecological Park.  All products for sale are made with recycled materials and are provided by local people in Gaborone, most of whom are impoverished or unemployed.  The purpose of the Green Shop is to encourage recycling and environmental awareness by promoting the re-use and sale of recyclable products. It also provides opportunities for urban and rural Batswana (people of Botswana) to generate income by selling green products and acts as a source of funding for Somarelang Tikologo's other environmental initiatives.

Items offered for sale include jewellery, handbags, hats, baskets, home decor, natural marula products, and herbal teas.

Community Organic Garden

As a way of educating the public and demonstrating how to cultivate organically grown vegetables, Somarelang Tikologo operates an organic garden using no pesticides or artificial fertilizers. Plants are fertilized with a natural brew of chicken manure, chili powder and food remains. Chicken manure helps to make vegetables grow without polluting the groundwater and the chili powder scares away insects without killing them.  Rainwater collected in tanks is also used to water the plants, making the entire process sustainable without posing a threat to the environment.

Organic vegetables such as spinach, rapeseed, spring onions, chomolia, chonga, tomatoes, and beetroot are all grown seasonally.

Public Recycling Drop-off Center
The drop-off center was officially opened in the Ecological Park on September 1, 2005. It is intended to reduce the amount of solid waste going into landfills. Members of the public are encouraged to drop off glass, paper, plastics and cans which are then collected for recycling by respective recycling companies.  All plastics and glass are transported by truck to recycling facilities in South Africa and all paper products are transported by truck to recycling facilities in Zimbabwe.

The first of its kind in Botswana, this drop-off center has been used as a pilot project for the development of a number of other recycling drop-off centers constructed within Gaborone. It provides opportunities for Batswana (people of Botswana) to participate in the whole waste management process, which begins with sorting waste at home.

Eco Cafe

The Eco Cafe is an environmentally friendly refreshment stand offering guests to Somarelang Tikologo's ecological park a selection of organic and all natural snacks grown and processed in environmentally friendly ways.  Preparation and service of the items sold in the Eco Cafe are selected after considering their effects on the environment.

Fundraising And Events

Enviro Cycling Challenge
Somarelang Tikologo, with the help of BPOMAS will be hosting a Cycling event to be held on Sunday, 11 October 2009 at 06H00 at the Notwane Grounds next to the national stadium. This is to commemorate World Habitat Day which is a reminder to care and take collective responsibility for the habitat.

Sponsors
The Public Recycling Drop-off Center is sponsored by Kgalagadi Beverages Trust.

Partnerships
Students Without Borders (SWB) and World University Service of Canada (WUSC) provides Somarelang Tikologo with volunteers from Canada.

References

Environmental organisations based in Botswana
Organisations based in Gaborone